Matthew Rhys Gillam (born 4 October 1998) is an English footballer who plays for Northern Premier League side Glossop North End.

Career

Early life
Gillam was born in Bexley, Kent but moved with his family to Congleton, Cheshire, when he was only a few months old. He first started playing for a local junior side, where he was quickly scouted by Port Vale and signed up for their Academy system. At the age of 12 he was spotted by Manchester City scouts and spent three months there before joining the Stoke City Academy. He was not offered a scholarship by Stoke, so he subsequently moved to Rochdale where they did offer him one.

Rochdale 
He signed his first professional contract with Rochdale during the summer of 2016, after the youngster came through the youth ranks at the Crown Oil Arena. His first appearance for the club came on 9 November 2016 in the EFL Trophy, with a 2-1 win over Hartlepool. He marked the occasion with a debut goal.

At the end of the 2017-2018 season, Gillam's contract was due to expire in the summer. On 25 May 2018, the 19 year old signed a new two-year deal with Rochdale. In February 2019, following a week long trial, Gillam signed a short term loan contract with Cork City until July.

Non-league
On 14 August 2020, following on from his release from Rochdale, he signed for National League North side Guiseley following a recommendation from his former Rochdale teammate, Brad Wade. The season was curtailed due to Covid-19 and Gillam only went on to make nine appearances for the club. 

On 28 August 2021, he dropped down a division to sign for Northern Premier League Premier Division side Atherton Collieries, where he would contribute seven goals and four assists over 33 competitive appearances, before signing for Glossop North End on 6 June 2022.

Career statistics

References

External links
Soccerway Profile

English footballers
1997 births
Living people
Rochdale A.F.C. players
Stalybridge Celtic F.C. players
Cork City F.C. players
Guiseley A.F.C. players
Atherton Collieries A.F.C. players
English Football League players
National League (English football) players
Northern Premier League players
League of Ireland players
Association football forwards